Natural hygiene can refer to:

 a school of medical thought also named orthopathy, founded by Sylvester Graham or Herbert M. Shelton
 a reference to the hygiene hypothesis

See also
 Natural Cures movement of Europe